The following is a list of Eastern Kentucky Colonels men's basketball head coaches. There have been 20 head coaches of the Colonels in their 110-season history.

Eastern Kentucky's current head coach is A. W. Hamilton. He was hired as the Colonels' head coach in March 2018, replacing Dan McHale, who was fired after the 2017–18 season.

References

Eastern Kentucky

Eastern Kentucky Colonels men's basketball coaches